Reaching Out is a 2001 Hong Kong television drama produced by TVB and starring Gordon Lam, Kenix Kwok, Benny Chan, Nicola Cheung and Michelle Ye. This series is Lam's last television role before leaving TVB and fully concentrating on his film career.

Cast

Main cast
Gordon Lam as Tai Fuk-sang (戴福生)
Kenix Kwok as Yuk Hiu-kwan (郁曉君) / Claire Yuk (郁曉雅)
Benny Chan as Stone Lau (劉二索)
Nicola Cheung as Ko Wai-ting (高慧婷)
Michelle Ye as Jess Wan (尹雪宜)
Ha Yu as Lau Lik (劉力)
Michelle Yim as Chan Kiu (陳嬌)
Sammul Chan as Ken Kwok (郭啟邦)

Other cast
Celia Sie as Vivian Ko (高慧雲)
Chan Kwai-lam as Chan Ka-ming (陳家明)
Bowie Wu as Kam Hon-to (甘翰韜)
Yu Yeung as Kwok Wang-kei (郭宏基)
Chan Ka Yee as Fong Yuk-ling (方玉玲)
Wong Wai as Ko Siu-tong (高兆堂)
Wai Ka Hung as Chin Chun (前進)
Law Lan as Chow Yim-hung (周艷紅)
Celine Ma as Lu Lu-kwan
Yeung Ying Wai as Eric
Lau Kong as Cho Sai-cheung (曹世昌)
Pak Yan as Seung-koon Yuk (上官玉)

External links
Official website

Hong Kong television series
TVB dramas
2001 Hong Kong television series debuts
2001 Hong Kong television series endings
Serial drama television series
2000s Hong Kong television series